Richard Tomlinson (born 1963) is a New Zealand-born British former Secret Intelligence Service (MI6) officer.

Richard Tomlinson may also refer to:

Richard Tomlinson (academic) (born 1932), British archaeologist
Richard Tomlinson (MP), Member of Parliament (MP) for Weymouth and Melcombe Regis
Richard H. Tomlinson (c. 1924–2018), Canadian chemist and philanthropist
Dick Tomlinson (Richard Kent Tomlinson), American football player
Walter Montgomery (actor) (Richard Tomlinson, 1827–1871), American-British actor

See also
Ricky Tomlinson (born 1939), British actor
Rick Tomlinson, English musician